NutriMag Magazine was a short lived (1999–2001, 9 issues) publication on nutrition, sports science and fitness in the United States. It focused discussions on the real facts of the supplement industry.  It was the official magazine of the Nutri-Sport Nutrition stores.

References

Defunct magazines published in the United States
Magazines established in 1999
Magazines disestablished in 2001
Magazines published in California
Mass media in San Diego
Nine times annually magazines
Sports magazines published in the United States
Sports nutrition
1999 establishments in California